Zygaena corsica is a species of moth in the Zygaenidae family. It is found on Corsica and Sardinia.
Seitz describes as - A peculiar small Burnet with 5 almost equal-sized spots which are very round and glossy bright red, the ground-colour between them having in certain aspect a somewhat brassy lustre. — In May and June in Sardinia and Corsica. — Larva light grey-blue, at the side a dark hue, and on the back a white one, along which there are black spots; in May on Santolina nicana. Cocoon light brown. The moths in June and July, on sunny slopes, especially frequent at higher altitudes.

The larvae feed on Santolina insularis and Plagius flosculosum.

References

Moths described in 1828
Zygaena
Moths of Europe